Matt Lawrence or Matthew Lawrence may refer to:

 Matt Lawrence (American football) (born 1985), American football running back
 Matt Lawrence (producer), British engineer, record producer and mixer
 Matthew Lawrence (born 1980), American actor and singer
 Matt Lawrence (footballer) (born 1974), English footballer

See also
Matthew Laurance (born 1950), American film and television actor and comedian